Pierre Antoine Muraccioli (born 4 June 1944), known professionally as Antoine, is a French pop singer, and also a sailor, adventurer, writer, photographer, and filmmaker.

As a musician, he was part of a new wave of mid-to-late 1960s French singer-songwriters, comparable in some ways to Bob Dylan or Donovan, but also evidencing some of the harder-edged garage rock style similar to The Rolling Stones, The Animals, and Them, and achieving some measure of pop stardom.

Beginning in the 1970s, he de-emphasized his musical endeavors (although he still writes and performs on occasion) in favor of a second career as a solo sailor and adventurer, which he has documented with many books and films.

Early life
From a Corsican family, Antoine was born on June 4, 1944, in Toamasina in Madagascar, then part of the French colonial empire for which his father was working. As a child he lived in Saint Pierre and Miquelon, Marseille, and French Cameroons, returning to Metropolitan France for good in 1958. He graduated from the Lycée Champollion in Grenoble, excelling in advanced mathematics.

A 1964 stay in the United States exposed Antoine to the burgeoning folk music revival on the American east coast. He enrolled as an engineering student in the École Centrale Paris (from which he graduated in 1966), but also began traveling, playing his guitar, and singing in bistros for pocket money. He also began writing songs.

Garage rock icon and later musical career
Signing with the Disques Vogue record label in 1965, Antoine released his first single "European Highway Number 4". In 1966 he released the EP Antoine's Fever Dreams against the advice of his producer Christian Fechner and Vogue management. The record, with protest songs and exhibiting a garage band style in sharp contrast to the yé-yé style then in vogue, resounded with the less carefree and more militant spirit growing among French youth (this was two years before the May 1968 events in France). Along with figures such as Jacques Dutronc and Michel Polnareff (and to some degree Ronnie Bird and Herbert Leonard), Antoine thus led a new wave in French music. The title song was Antoine's biggest hit.

Antoine's first full LP album was Antoine Meets the Problems, made with the existing band les Problèmes (who soon renamed themselves les Charlots and went on to long-term success, particularly in film). Some of the songs on the album were of Antoine and les Problèmes playing together, but many were by Antoine alone or les Problèmes alone, and many were previously released singles. One song on the album which became particularly associated with Antoine was "I'll Say What I Think and I'll Live How I Want"

Having achieved some mainstream popularity, Antoine fell more under the control of his producer, being given songs he did not always like and being pressured to change his musical style and even appearance. A 1968 song "Take Me Home" suggested his disillusionment with being a musician, even as his popularity was spreading to Itally, where, after an initial hit, "Pietre" (Stones), still in the protest-song vein, he shifted
soon toward a soft pop style
and scored some successes like "Cannella" and "La tramontana".

In 1971, he recorded a single with celebrity television host Danièle Gilbert, "'Scuse Me, Mister Antoine" and in 1973 he appeared in the revival of the 1921 operetta Dédé, singing alongside Georgette Plana.

Although he has never stopped writing and performing music, in 1974 he shifted his focus to the sea and to other pursuits.

Rivalry with Johnny Hallyday
In "Antoine's Fever Dreams" (the title song to the EP of the same name), Antoine, who represented with his emblematic long hair and flowered shirts a new look and new sound, made fun of Johnny Hallyday (the "French Elvis", a pioneer and icon of French rock and roll, but outdated in Antoine's eyes): "Things should keep on changing / The world would be much more fun / We'd see airplanes in the subway corridors / And Johnny Hallyday in a Circus Medrano zoo cage". Hallyday responded with an answer song "Long Hair and Short Ideas" ("If words were sufficient to make things so / Then he, with his long hair, and sitting on his hands / Would indeed have me locked in a cage...") and the two commenced a back-and-forth rivalry which redounded to the publicity benefit of both (Hallyday's song was a hit and helped revivify his career) and which continued in various songs and other forms into the 21st century (for instance, with each appearing in TV advertising for competing optician chains in the 2000s).

Sailor
In 1969 Antoine discovered sailing by chance, after renting a house on the French Riviera which included a dinghy. In October 1974, Antoine embarked on the life of a sailor and adventurer. He set out on the 14-meter steel schooner Om, sailing 17,000 miles solo and calling on Atlantic ports such as Nouadhibou, Rio de Janeiro, St. Helena, Tristan da Cunha, and Cayenne until 1980.

From 1981 to 1989, Antoine sailed in the Atlantic and Pacific in the 10-meter aluminum sloop Voyage, and since 1989 he has sailed in the 12.5-meter catamaran Banana Split.

Antoine published the first book of his adventures, Globedrifter in 1977; several more have followed, including his book on distance navigation Setting Sail Antoine has made films of his voyages, and has appeared on radio and television describing his adventures, as well published various books. He continues to write new songs (such as "Hands Off The Sea") and give occasional concerts. He has lectured at conferences sponsored by World Knowledge, the large French conference organization. When not at sea or traveling he lives with his long-term companion Francette in Paris or at a farm in Auvergne he bought with his early pop-star royalties.

Works

Discography

Singles
"Les Elucubrations D'Antoine" (1966, France), Disques Vogue – V 4225)
"Un éléphant me regarde" (1966, France), Disques Vogue – V.45-1363)
"La tramontana"/"Voglio andare in guerra" (1968, Italy) Fonit Cetra
"Taxi" (1970, France), Disques Vogue –  V. 45-1701)
"Bonne Chance" (1971, France), Disques Vogue – 45. V.4013)
"'Scusez-Moi M'sieur Antoine" (with Danièle Gilbert)(1971, France), Disques Vogue –  45 V 4004)
"Ra-Ta-Ta" (1990, France), Disques Vogue

EPs
Les Elucubrations D'Antoine (1966 (France), Disques Vogue – EPL 8417)

Albums
Antoine Rencontre Les Problèmes (as Antoine Et Les Problèmes) (1966 (France), Disques Vogue – LVLXS 82-30)
Madame Laure Messenger, Claude, Jeremie, Et L'Existence De Dieu (1966 (France), Disques Vogue – CLD 712 )
Antoine (1966 (France), Disques Vogue)
Antoine (1967 (France?) RTE Records)1967
Je Reprends La Route Demain(1967 (France), Disques Vogue – CLD 707 30)
À L'Olympia [live album] (1968 (France), Disques Vogue – CLVLX 363)
Antoine (1968 (France), Disques Vogue – CLD 725)
Dites-Moi Ma Mère (1969 (France), Disques Vogue – SLVLX 395)
Album Pour Les Grands Et Jeux Pour Tout Petits... (1969 (France), Disques Vogue – ANT. 1)
Ra-Ta-Ta (1970 (France), Disques Vogue – SLD 778)
Larraldia (1971 (France), Disques Vogue – SLD. 808)
Nocciolino (1978, Italy), Fonit Cetra

Bibliography
 Globe-flotteur ou Les 7 péchés capitaux d'un navigateur solitaire, Arthaud, collection Mer, 1977
 Mettre les voiles avec Antoine, Arthaud, 1977
 Bord à bord, Arthaud, collection Mer, 1979
 Solitaire et Compagnie, Arthaud, collection Mer, 1980
 Cocotiers, Arthaud, 1981
 Voyage aux Amériques, Arthaud, 1985
 1965 (roman), 1987
 Iles… était une fois Gallimard, 1989
 Amoureux de la Terre Gallimard, 1991
 Sur trois océans Gallimard, 1993
 Fêtes la cuisine Gallimard, 1995
 Collection Merveilleuses îles ( 8 volumes)
 La Plus Belle Ile du Monde (La Martinière)
 D'Île en Île (Hermé)
 Autobiographie : Vol. 1 Oh Yeah, Arthaud, 2007
 Autobiographie : Vol. 2 Au bout de mes rêves, Arthaud, 2008
 20 Paradis, Gallimard, 2009
 Au Paradis des Animaux, Gallimard, 2011
 Délivrez-nous des dogmes, Léo Scheer, 2012
 40 Escales, 40 ans de navigation'', Gallimard, 2014

Filmography

References
General references

References for particular works

Notes

External links
Antoine's website 
Scopitone of "Les Elucubrations D'Antoine" (video)

1944 births
French people of Corsican descent
People from Toamasina
French male singers
French rock singers
Protopunk musicians
French sailors
French non-fiction outdoors writers
French travel writers
20th-century French non-fiction writers
20th-century French male writers
21st-century French non-fiction writers
French filmmakers
Living people
French male non-fiction writers